The British Armed Forces had several temporary military bases in Iraq and Kuwait between 2003 and 2009, most were controlled by Multi-National Division (South-East).

Depending on their size or utility, the facilities are called : Camp, Forward Operating Base (FOB), Combat Outpost (COP), Patrol Base (PB), Outpost, Logistics Base (Log Base), Fire Base (FB).

Installations

Iraq

Kuwait

See also
 Siege of U.K. bases in Basra
 Operation Telic
 Operation Telic order of battle

References

Citations

Bibliography

Military installations of Iraq
Military installations of the United Kingdom